Jane Van Etten, sometimes credited under her married name, Jane Van Etten Andrews (born 1871), was an American composer and singer, one of the first female composers in the United States to have an opera produced by a regular opera company. This was Guido Ferranti, a one-act opera to a libretto by Elsie M. Wilbor based on the play The Duchess of Padua by Oscar Wilde.  It was premiered on December 29, 1914, in Chicago by the Century Opera Company at the Auditorium Theater. Hazel Eden was Beatrice and Worthe Faulkner Guido Ferranti; the opera was conducted by Agide Jacchia. The piece received the Bispham Memorial Medal Award. It was said that Van Etten had not studied orchestration, harmony or counterpoint prior to the composition of the opera. The opera won great critical acclaim, but appears not to have been performed again after its premiere. Its music has been described as "tuneful in the Puccini mode".

Biography 
Van Etten was a native of St. Paul, Minnesota; the daughter of Isaac Van Etten, a prominent local lawyer and politician, she was descended from the Van Etten family of New York. She studied music in New York City, Paris, and London; her debut came as Siébel in Faust at the Theatre Royal, Drury Lane in 1895. Among her teachers was Mathilde Marchesi. Upon her marriage in 1901 she gave up singing to concentrate on composition, though she later worked as a teacher of voice in Chicago; she and her husband, Alfred Burritt Andrews, lived in Evanston, Illinois. Besides the opera, her compositions include songs.  Her teachers of composition included Alexander von Fielitz and Bernhard Ziehn.

Van Etten's date of death is unknown. Two of her songs have been recorded.

References

1871 births
Year of death unknown
American women classical composers
American classical composers
American opera composers
American operatic mezzo-sopranos
19th-century American women opera singers
19th-century classical composers
20th-century classical composers
Musicians from Saint Paul, Minnesota
Women opera composers
Singers from Minnesota
20th-century American women opera singers
20th-century American composers
19th-century American composers
Classical musicians from Minnesota
20th-century women composers
19th-century women composers